Sunyani West may refer to:
 Sunyani West (Ghana parliament constituency)
 Sunyani West District